Charles Herbert Wilson (February 15, 1917 – July 21, 1984) was a California Democratic politician from the Los Angeles area.  He served as a member of the U.S. House of Representatives from 1963 to 1981.

Early life
Wilson was born in Magna, Utah, and moved with his parents in 1922 to Los Angeles, California.  He attended public schools in Los Angeles and Inglewood, where he was later an employee at a bank, from 1935 to 1942.

Wilson served as a Staff Sergeant in the United States Army from June 1942 to December 1945, where he gained experience overseas in the European Theater of Operations.  He returned home and in 1945 opened his own insurance agency in Los Angeles.

Political career

Wilson served as a member of the California State Assembly from the 66th District from 1955 to 1963.

He was elected as a Democrat to the United States House of Representatives, where he served from January 3, 1963, to January 3, 1981. On June 10, 1980, Wilson was reprimanded by the House of Representatives, for financial misconduct stemming from the Koreagate scandal.  Wilson was defeated in the 1980 primary election for the Democratic Party nomination to the Ninety-seventh Congress, when he was defeated by former California Lieutenant Governor Mervyn M. Dymally. Wilson is, to date, the last white Congressman to represent the 31st District.  This loss was due in part due to the vote of censure by the House of Representatives.

Death
Wilson resided in Tantallon, Maryland, towards the end of his life, and died in Clinton, Maryland, on July 21, 1984.  He is interred at Inglewood Park Cemetery, in Inglewood, California.

See also

List of federal political scandals in the United States
List of United States representatives expelled, censured, or reprimanded
Unification Church

References

External links
Join California Charles H. Wilson

 

1917 births
1984 deaths
20th-century American politicians
Burials at Inglewood Park Cemetery
Censured or reprimanded members of the United States House of Representatives
Democratic Party members of the United States House of Representatives from California
Democratic Party members of the California State Assembly
People from Magna, Utah
United States Army personnel of World War II
United States Army soldiers